Connection-Oriented Network Service (CONS) is one of the two Open Systems Interconnection (OSI) network layer protocols, the other being Connectionless-mode Network Service (CLNS). It is basically X.25, with a few adjustments.

Protocols providing CONS
Some protocols that provide the CONS service:

 X.25, as specified in ITU-T Recommendation X.223 is a Public Data Network protocol that provides the Connection Oriented Network Service as described in ITU-T Recommendation X.213.
 Signalling Connection Control Part (SCCP), as specified in ITU-T Recommendation Q.711 is a Signaling System 7 protocol that provides the Connection Oriented Network Service as described in ITU-T Recommendation X.213.
 Service Specific Connection Oriented Protocol (SSCOP), as specified in ITU-T Recommendation Q.2110 is an Asynchronous Transfer Mode protocol that provides the Connection Oriented Network Service as described in ITU-T Recommendation X.213.

OSI protocols
Network layer protocols